

Class

Cavallari CP400 is a deep-sea FPV – Fishery Patrol Vessel of the Italian Coast Guard, built in  CRN shipyard in Ancona.

Features

The Cavallari CP400 patrol boat class was built in four vessels, to CRN shipyards in Ancona, with hull in steel FE510D.

Between 2010 and 2012 vessels was refitted by SIMAN shipyards in La Spezia, with a few updates.
Original four diesel engines Isotta Fraschini ID36 SS8V, for  max speed and  range, were replaced by new Caterpillar diesel engines and displacement increased from 130 to 156 tons.

Vessels

References 

Corps of the Port Captaincies – Coast Guard
Patrol boat classes
Ships built in Ancona